The 2017 Prosperita Open was a professional tennis tournament played on clay courts. It was the 14th edition of the tournament which was part of the 2017 ATP Challenger Tour. It took place in Ostrava, Czech Republic between 1 and 7 May.

Point distribution

Singles main-draw entrants

Seeds

 1 Rankings are as of April 24, 2017.

Other entrants
The following players received wildcards into the singles main draw:
  Dominik Kellovský
  Zdeněk Kolář
  David Poljak
  Dominik Šproch

The following player received entry into the singles main draw using a protected ranking:
  Simone Bolelli

The following players received entry from the qualifying draw:
  Attila Balázs
  Reda El Amrani
  Lenny Hampel
  Sebastian Ofner

The following players received entry as lucky losers:
  Dragoș Dima
  Carlos Taberner

Champions

Singles
 
 Stefano Travaglia def.  Marco Cecchinato 6–2, 3–6, 6–4.

Doubles

 Jeevan Nedunchezhiyan /  Franko Škugor def.  Rameez Junaid /  Lukáš Rosol 6–3, 6–2.

External links
Official Website

Prosperita Open
Prosperita Open
2017 in Czech tennis
May 2017 sports events in Europe